The Mysterious Package Company is an experiential service established in 2013 which provides stories, puzzles and mysteries purchased as gifts and sent through the mail.

History 
Colin Bolton, Misha Schneider and Tim Sullivan co-founded The Mysterious Package Company in 2013, as they wanted to create wondrous stories delivered through the postal service.

In 2014 Jason Kapalka, a Vancouver-based entrepreneur came on board as primary investor. Kapalka is co-founder of PopCap Games and owner of the Storm Crow "nerd bars" in Vancouver and Toronto.

Kickstarter

The Century Beast 
In 2015 the company launched The Century Beast Kickstarter campaign. The campaign raised over $400K and was backed by 1,291 pledges.

Filigree in Shadow 
In 2016, the company introduced a Victorian horror Experience, Filigree in Shadow, as a Kickstarter campaign. Filigree in Shadow currently sits as the ninth-highest-funded art campaign on Kickstarter to date. It is also the second-most-funded mixed media campaign in the world. This campaign raised over $600K and was backed by 1,786 pledges.

Experiences 
Experiences are the Mysterious Package Company's primary product. They are stories or mysteries told over a series of mailings to the recipient. Each experience contains:

 Documents and other media
 An element of personalization or customization
 An artifact related to the details of the story, usually in a nailed-shut wooden crate
 A Reveal card identifying who sent the package(s), if they were a gift
Members purchase packages that they send to themselves or a recipient of their choice. The experiences feature genres such as mystery, horror, adventure, time-travel, and science-fiction, and range in duration from one to six mailings.

Curios & Conundrums 
Curios and Conundrums was a quarterly subscription box that ran from 2013 to 2018. Unlike the Experiences, it was not meant to be a realistic, coherent narrative, but a grab-bag or anthology of puzzles, stories, and interesting trinkets.

Volume III 
Issue 1 -  A new Era of Thought

 Eight-page broadsheet newspaper, filled with stories and puzzles, a poster, several travel stickers, and the cover of a magazine that may have been.

Issue 2 - The Child of the Cavern

 Twelve-page broadsheet newspaper, several travel stickers, a copy of their first game, Motherland, and a variety of other tools and techniques.

Issue 3 - From Death and Dark Oblivion

 Twelve-page broadsheet newspaper, several travel stickers, additional cards for Motherland, and a gift of real gold.

Issue 4 - At the Mountains of Madness

 Twelve-page broadsheet newspaper, several additional stickers, a game of goats, and some very disagreeable paper-crafts.

Volume IV 
Issue 1 - Gods of Madness

Issue 2 - Brain Butchers

Issue 3 - Clockwork Mutineers

Issue 4 - Countdown to Oblivion

References

External links
 

Internet properties established in 2013
Kickstarter-funded products